Brandon Hartson (born October 3, 1989) was an American football long snapper in the National Football League (NFL). He played college football at Houston.

Professional career

Chicago Bears
Hartson was signed by the Chicago Bears as an undrafted free agent on August 10, 2013 and released by the team on August 30. He re-signed with the Bears on December 30, 2013, and was released on August 31, 2014.

Kansas City Chiefs
Hartson signed with the Kansas City Chiefs on January 20, 2015. He was released by the Chiefs on April 16, 2015.

Pittsburgh Steelers
Hartson was acquired from waivers by the Pittsburgh Steelers on April 17, 2015 and released by the team on May 9.

Tampa Bay Buccaneers
Hartson signed with the Tampa Bay Buccaneers on August 27, 2015. He was released by the Buccaneers on August 30, 2015.

Dallas Cowboys
On March 31, 2016 Hartson signed with the Dallas Cowboys. He was released by the team on May 16, 2016.

References

1989 births
Living people
American football long snappers
Houston Cougars football players
Chicago Bears players
Kansas City Chiefs players
Pittsburgh Steelers players
Tampa Bay Buccaneers players
Dallas Cowboys players
Players of American football from Texas
People from Houston